The 2021–22 Euro Hockey Tour was the 26th season of Euro Hockey Tour. It started in November 2021 and lasted until May 2022. It consists of Karjala Tournament, Channel One Cup, Carlson Hockey Games and Beijer Hockey Games.

Standings

Karjala Tournament

The Karjala Tournament was played between 10–14 November 2021. Five matches were played in Helsinki, Finland and one match in Linköping, Sweden. Tournament was won by Sweden.

Channel One Cup 

The 2021 Channel One Cup was played between 16–19 December 2021. Seven matches were played in Moscow, Russia and one match in Prague, Czech Republic. This tournament also included Canada as well as the regular 4 EHT teams: Czech Republic, Finland, Russia and Sweden. The host nation Russia played 4 matches while the rest of the teams played 3 matches and the extra match was not taken into account when considering the cup champion. Since Finland did not play against Sweden, Russia - Sweden match is not considered for the championship, and therefore Finland won the championship even though Russia has more points in the standings table, since Finland defeated Russia in their match.

Carlson Hockey Games

The 2022 Carlson Hockey Games was played between 28 April–1 May 2022. Five matches were in Ostrava, Czech Republic and one match in Vienna, Austria.

Beijer Hockey Games

The 2022 Beijer Hockey Games was played between 5–8 May 2022. Five matches were in Stockholm, Sweden and one match in Tampere, Finland.

External links
 European Hockey Tour on Eurohockey.com

References 

 
Euro Hockey Tour
2021–22 in European ice hockey